HEH Nizam and Alladin Technical Institute, generally known as Alladin Technical Institute, is among the institutes founded by Khan Bahadur Ahmed Alladin that were aided by HEH Mir Osman Ali Khan, Asaf Jah VII in early 1950.

History
It was formed to provide technical education to the underprivileged residents of Hyderabad, India, which was out of reach for poor students. From its inception until 1961 it was funded by the Mecca Madina Wakf Board and, due to financial trouble, it was sponsored by the H.E.H. the Nizam's Charitable Trust and Alladin Wakf.

The institute is certified by Ministry of Labour and Employment, Union Government of India. Referred as an industrial training institute (ITI) the certificate issued by ITI to its pupils is referred as National Trade Certificates.

Academics
Courses are offered in five trade discipline with 20 seats for each trade.

 Motor mechanic
 Electrician
 Electronic 
 Machinist
 Air conditioner and refrigeration specialist

The minimum qualification required is SSC. It is a two-year diploma course with an internship programme of six months conducted during the last semester of the course.

Job placement

Placement opportunities and assistance are provided to the students by the institute, most former students were recruited for the government and MNCs such as Toyota, Voltas, Carrier air conditioning, BHEL, ECIL and CPDCL.

See also 
Education in India
Literacy in India
List of institutions of higher education in Telangana

References

External links

Universities and colleges in Hyderabad, India
Educational institutions established in 1950
1950 establishments in India